Shadow Man (Malayalam: ഷാഡോ മാൻ) is a Malayalam suspense thriller film directed by Majo C. Mathew. The only character in the film is played by Riyaz Khan.

Plot
Surya is a real estate agent. One day gets trapped in a site where he goes to look for his boss. There a shadow begins following him...

Cast
Riyaz Khan as Surya

References

External links

Official trailer

2014 films
2010s Malayalam-language films
Indian thriller films
One-character films
2014 thriller films